is a Japanese footballer who plays for Gainare Tottori.

Career
After graduating at Yamanashi Gakuin University, Kobayashi was signed by Gainare Tottori in December 2017.

Club statistics
Updated to 23 August 2018.

References

External links

Profile at J. League
Profile at Gainare Tottori

1995 births
Living people
Association football people from Yamanashi Prefecture
Japanese footballers
J3 League players
Gainare Tottori players
Association football midfielders